American Blues 'Is Here' is a studio album by the psychedelic blues-rock band American Blues. The band is known for featuring future ZZ Top members Frank Beard and Dusty Hill. The album is sometimes referred to as simply American Blues or Is Here.

Track listing
 "If I Were a Carpenter" – 5:26
 "All I Saw Was You" – 3:46
 "She'll Be Mine" – 1:51
 "Fugue for Lady Cheriff" – 2:14
 "It's Gone" – 2:00
 "Keep My Heart in a Rage" – 2:40
 "Mercury Blues" – 4:15
 "Melted Like Snow" – 3:15
 "Mellow" – 2:08

Personnel
Rocky Hill – guitar, vocals
Doug Davis – keyboards
Dusty Hill – bass
Frank Beard – drums

1968 debut albums
American Blues albums